Nathan "Johnny" Roeg (6 January 1910 – 21 October 2003) was a Dutch footballer who played as a striker for Ajax.

Roeg was Jewish, and was one of only five Jewish players to have played for Ajax - the others being Eddy Hamel, Bennie Muller, Sjaak Swart and Daniël de Ridder. During the Holocaust, he hid from the Nazis and managed to avoid being captured, while about 80 per cent of his fellow Amsterdam Jews were killed.

References

External links
 In memoriam Johnny Roeg

1910 births
2003 deaths
Dutch footballers
AFC Ajax players
Jewish footballers
Jewish Dutch sportspeople
Footballers from Amsterdam
Association football forwards